Rusokastro (from Greek Ρουσόκαστρο) is a village in Kameno Municipality, in Burgas Province, in southeastern Bulgaria.

Rusokastro Rock in Antarctica is named after the village.

References

 Medieval Bulgarian Fortress Rusokastro

Villages in Burgas Province